Luka Zarandia (born 17 February 1996) is a Georgian professional footballer who plays as a winger.

Early life

As a child, Zarandia played tennis.

Club career
After starting career in hometown club Locomotive Tbilisi, Zarandia moved to Poland in 2017 and joined Arka Gdynia. He made his debut for the club in April 2017 in the Polish Cup game against Wigry Suwałki.

In July 2019, Zulte Waregem announced the signing of the Zarandia on a three-year agreement.

On 29 March 2022, he joined Polish I liga side Korona Kielce, led by Leszek Ojrzyński with whom he previously worked with at Arka, until the end of the season. He stayed with the team following their promotion to Ekstraklasa before terminating his contract by mutual consent on 2 November 2022, shortly after Ojrzyński's dismissal.

International
He made his debut for Georgia national football team on 16 October 2018 in a 2018–19 UEFA Nations League D game against Latvia.

Honours

Club
Arka Gdynia
 Polish Cup: 2016–17
 Polish Super Cup: 2017, 2018

References

External links
UEFA Profile

Arka Gdynia Player Profile

1996 births
Footballers from Tbilisi
Living people
Footballers from Georgia (country)
Georgia (country) youth international footballers
Georgia (country) under-21 international footballers
Georgia (country) international footballers
Association football midfielders
K.R.C. Genk players
Arka Gdynia players
S.V. Zulte Waregem players
FC Tobol players
Korona Kielce players
Ekstraklasa players
I liga players
III liga players
Belgian Pro League players
Expatriate footballers from Georgia (country)
Expatriate footballers in Poland
Expatriate sportspeople from Georgia (country) in Poland
Expatriate footballers in Belgium
Expatriate sportspeople from Georgia (country) in Belgium
Expatriate footballers in Kazakhstan
Expatriate sportspeople from Georgia (country) in Kazakhstan